False coral may refer to many species of snakes, including:

several species of the genus Erythrolamprus:
 Erythrolamprus aesculapii, a mildly venomous colubrid snake species found in South America.
 Erythrolamprus bizona, a harmless colubrid snake species found in South America.
 Erythrolamprus ocellatus, a.k.a. the Tobago false coral, a harmless colubrid snake species found on the island of Tobago.
several of species of the genus Oxyrhopus:
 Oxyrhopus guibei, a nonvenomous South American snake.
 Oxyrhopus petola, a mildly venomous colubrid snake species found in South America.
both species of the genus Pliocercus
the family Aniliidae, which contains one species

False coral may also refer to a species of bryozoan, ''Myriapora truncata.